Celebration Tour may refer to:
Celebration Tour (No Angels), 2022
Madonna: The Celebration Tour, 2023